Adrian Holdstock (born 27 April 1970) is a South African cricket umpire and former cricketer who now serves as ICC international cricket umpire. He is part of Cricket South Africa's umpire panel for first-class matches.

Career
Holdstock played for Western Province between 1989 and 1993 before playing for Boland 1993 and 1995. After finishing playing Holdstock took up umpiring. He made his list A umpiring debut in 2006 and his first class debut in 2007.

In 2011, Holdstock made his international Twenty20 debut. He umpired in three One Day International games in 2013. In January 2020, he was named as one of the sixteen umpires for the 2020 Under-19 Cricket World Cup tournament in South Africa.

On 26 December 2020, Holdstock stood in his first Test match as an umpire, in the first Test between South Africa and Sri Lanka.

He was selected as one of the match officials for 2021 ICC Men's T20 World Cup.
In March 2023, Holdstock and Ahsan Raza from Pakistan were inducted into the Elite Panel of ICC Umpires after Aleem Dar left the panel.

See also
 List of Test cricket umpires
 List of One Day International cricket umpires
 List of Twenty20 International cricket umpires

References

1970 births
Living people
South African cricket umpires
South African Test cricket umpires
South African One Day International cricket umpires
South African Twenty20 International cricket umpires
People from Cape Town
Boland cricketers
Western Province cricketers